An articulating screen is a built-in small electronic visual display which is not fixed, but rather can be repositioned using a hinge or pivot. The articulating screen is known under different other names such as flip-out screen, flip screen, adjustable screen, articulated screen, or hinged screen. According to the way it moves, there are four main types: 

The display moves around one axis, so that it only tilts. It is called tilting screen or tiltable screen.
The display tilts horizontally both up and down and also vertically. This type is called double-hinged tilting screen, two-axis tilting screen, three-direction tilting screen or screen with 3-way tilt.
The display moves around two axes which are at a right angle to each other, so that the screen both tilts and swivels. This type is called swivel screen. Other names for this type are vari-angle screen, fully articulated screen, fully articulating screen, rotating screen, multi-angle screen, variable angle screen, flip-out-and-twist screen, twist-and-tilt screen and swing-and-tilt screen.
The display is mounted on a fully-articulating hinge that itself is attached to a tilting plate. Such display can be extended out from the back of the camera, ensuring it stays clear of the camera's left-mounted ports when flipping it out to the side. This type of articulating screen is called tilt-and-articulating screen.
The display moves into a variety of angles; it tilts horizontally and vertically and also rotates to a certain extent while staying aligned with the lens axis. It still can not be turned all the way up, down or to the side to be seen from the front of the camera for self-portraits. This type of articulating screen is called cross-tilt screen, flexible-tilt screen or flex-tilt screen.

Articulating screens are used in a variety of electronic devices such as laptops, camcorders, digital cameras, desk phones, mobile phones, DVD players and others; also TV screens and computer monitors can be articulating screens.

This article focuses on digital photography, where an articulating screen allows convenient or unobtrusive shooting from various perspectives.

Digital cameras with a tilting screen
The tilting screens of camera models marked with an asterisk (*) here below can be tilted by 180 degrees or close to it so that they may be used to take self portraits more easily.

Canon

Casio

Fujifilm

Hasselblad
X2D 100C (2022)

JVC
GC-PX10(*) (2011)

Kodak
Pixpro S-1 (2014)

Konica Minolta
DiMAGE A2 (2004)

Lytro
Illium (2014)

Medion
Life P44034 (MD 86934)(*) (2014)

Minolta
DiMAGE A1 (2003)

Nikon

Olympus

Panasonic

Pentax

Praktica
Luxmedia 18-Z36C (2012)

Rollei

Samsung

Sony

Vivikai
DC-1550(*) (2011)

Vivitar (ViviCam iTwist series)

Yongnuo

Digital cameras with a double-hinged tilting screen

Fujifilm

Panasonic

Digital cameras with a swivel screen

BenQ
G1 (2012)

Canon

Casio

Fujifilm

Kodak

Konica Minolta
DiMAGE A200 (2004)

Leica

Nikon

Olympus

OM Digital Solutions

Panasonic

Pentax

Protax

Ricoh

Samsung

Sony

Vivikai
DC600 (2010)

Digital cameras with a tilt-and-articulating screen

Panasonic

Sony

Digital cameras with a cross-tilt screen

Pentax
K-1 (2016)
K-1 II (2018)

Accessories
Aftermarket products are available which can be fitted to static screen cameras. These reflect the screen image, or capture and duplicate the image.

See also

Swivel lens
Waist-level finder — film camera optical focusing screen viewed from above

References

Live-preview digital cameras